Athletes from the Netherlands competed at the 1952 Summer Olympics in Helsinki, Finland.

Medalists

Silver
 Bertha Brouwer — Athletics, Women's 200 metres
 Jules Ancion, André Boerstra, Harry Derckx, Han Drijver, Dick Esser, Roepie Kruize, Dick Loggere, Lau Mulder, Eddy Tiel, Wim van Heel, and Henk Wery — Field Hockey, Men's Team Competition
 Hannie Termeulen — Swimming, Women's 100m Freestyle
 Geertje Wielema — Swimming, Women's 100m Backstroke
 Irma Heijting-Schuhmacher, Hannie Termeulen, Marie-Louise Linssen-Vaessen and Koosje van Voorn — Swimming, Women's 4 × 100 m Freestyle Relay

Results by event

Boxing
Men's Flyweight (–51 kg)
 Hein van der Zee
 First Round — Lost to Anatoli Bulakov (Soviet Union) on points (0-3)

Men's Light Welterweight (–63,5 kg)
 Piet van Klaveren
 First Round — Defeated Roy Keenan (Canada) on points (2-1)
 Second Round — Lost to Terence Milligan (Ireland) on points (0-3)

Men's Welterweight (–67 kg)
 Moos Linneman
 First Round — Defeated Peter Müller (Germany) by walk-over in third round
 Second Round — Defeated George Issabeg (Iran) on points (2-1)
 Quarterfinals — Lost to Günther Heidemann (Germany) on points (0-3)

Men's Middleweight (–75 kg)
 Leen Jansen
 First Round — Bye
 Second Round — Defeated Robert Malouf (Canada) on technical knock-out in first round
 Quarterfinals — Lost to Floyd Patterson (United States) on knock-out in first round

Men's Light Heavyweight (–81 kg)
 Toon Pastor
 First Round — Defeated István Fazekas (Hungary) on points (3-0)
 Second Round — Lost to Karl Kistner (Germany) on points (1-2)

Cycling

Road Competition
Men's Individual Road Race (190.4 km)
Arend van 't Hoft — 5:11:19.0 (→ 10th place)
Jan Plantaz — 5:16:19.1 (→ 22nd place)
Adrie Voorting — 5:24:44.6 (→ 49th place)
Jules Maenen — did not finish (→ no ranking)

Track Competition
Men's 1.000m Time Trial
Johan Hijzelendoorn
 Final — 1:14.5 (→ 8th place)

Men's 1.000m Sprint Scratch Race
Johan Hijzelendoorn — 9th place

Men's 4.000m Team Pursuit
Adrie Voorting, Daan de Groot, Jan Plantaz, and Jules Maenen  
 Eliminated in quarterfinals (→ 7th place)

Rowing

Netherlands had 12 male rowers participate in four out of seven rowing events in 1952.

 Men's single sculls
 Rob van Mesdag

 Men's coxless pair
 Ben Binnendijk
 Carl Kuntze

 Men's coxless four
 Frits de Voogt
 Ruud Sesink Clee
 Jan op den Velde
 Kees van Vugt

 Men's coxed four
 Ton Fontani
 Han Heijenbrock
 Jan Willem Pennink
 Jaap Beije
 Hans Caro (cox)

Water Polo

Men's Team Competition
Qualifying Round
Defeated Soviet Union (3:2)
Preliminary Round (Group C)
Defeated Argentina (9:3)
Defeated Sweden (7:1)
Defeated Yugoslavia (3:2)
Last match was replayed after a protest by the Yugoslavs against one of the referees; The Netherlands lost the replay (1:2) on August 1, 1952.
Semi Final (Group F)
Tied with Hungary (4:4)
Defeated Soviet Union (4:2)
Classification Matches
Defeated Belgium (5:3)
Defeated Spain (7:1) → Fifth place
Team Roster
Gerrit Bijlsma
Cor Braasem
Joop Cabout
Ruud van Feggelen
Max van Gelder
Nijs Korevaar
Frits Smol

References

Official Olympic Reports
International Olympic Committee results database

Nations at the 1952 Summer Olympics
1952
Olympics